Hani Ramzi (born 26 October 1964) is an Egyptian actor and one of the most famous comedians in Egypt.

Early life 
Hani Ramzy who was born in Alexandria, grew up in Beni Mazar, Minya Governorate. Later on, he studied at the Faculty of Commerce, Cairo University, then joined the Institute of Performing Arts. His debut was with a single sword in the play Ana ayza millionaire author playwright Yusri El-Ebyari and then with Mohamed Sobhi  he participated in  plays  Takharif   and  Weghat Nazar, also participated in a number of roles and then he starred in a series of films. Hany Adel Ramzy was born in the city of Minya, his father is a lawyer. Ramzy is married to a woman from Asyut, Mona Mohab and they have 2 boys together, Shady and Jesse.

Films
 Nasser 56 1995 (Naser 56)
 Se'idi Fi El Gam'ah  El Amrikiyyah 1998. (Upper Egyptian In American University)
 Fer'et Banat W Bass 1999  (A band Of Girls Only )
 Wa La Fi  El Neyyah Ab'a?    1999 (And No intention To Be?)
 El-Hobb El-Awwal 2000 (First Love) 
 Etfarrag Ya Salam 2001(Watch  Wow)
 Gawaz Be Qarar Gomhori 2001 (Marriage By Presidential Decision)
 Se'idi Rayeh Jayy  2001(Upper Egyptian To And Fro)
 Mohami Khol''' 2002 ( Attorney Of Divorce)
 Ayez Haqqi 2003(I Want My Share)
 Ghabi Mennoh Fih 2004 (Stupid From Him In Him)
 El-Sayyed Abu-El-Arabi Wasal 2005 (Mister Abu-El-Arabi  Reached)
 Zaza 2006 (Zaza)
 Asad W Arba' Otat 2007  ( Lion And Four Cats)                          
 Nems Bond 2008 (Nems Bond)
 El Ragel El Ghamed Be Salamtoh 2010 (Mysterious Man By His Wow )
 Sami oxid El-Carbon 2011(Sami Oxide Of Carbon)
 Tom We Jemi 2013 (Tom And Jemi)
 Nom El Talat 2015 (Sleep Of Tuesday)

Television
 Hawl Al Alam 1986 ( Trans World )
 Alef Lilah W Lilah  1986 (Thousand And One Nights)
 El Les  Ellazi Ohebboh 1997(The Thief Whom I Love)
 Mabruk Galak Ala' 2006 (Congratulation You Got Worry)
 Esabet Mama W Papa 2009(Gang Of Mama And Papa)
 Aris Delivery 2011(Groom Delivery)
 Ebn El Nezam 2012 ( Son Of Regime)
 El Lela Di 2012-2013 (This Night)
 Nazaryet El Gawafa 2013 (Guava's Theory)
 El Aris Raqam 13  2014  (Groom Number 13)
 El Shohrah 2014 ( Fame)
 Hobot Idterari 2015 (Obligatory Landing)
 Hany Fi El Adghal 2016 (Hany In Jungle)

Voice
In Arabic:
 Toy Story 1995
 Toy Story 2 1999
 Ramadona 2011

Theater
 Koll Marra Ashofak Fiha (Every Time I See You) Takharif (Fables) Weghet Nazar (View Point) Keda Okkeh  (So , Ok) Alabanda (To The Band) 
 Afrotto 1999 (Demon) Ana Ayza Millionaire (I Want A Millionaire)''

Shows
Hani started a prank show in Ramadan. He invites Arab celebrities and pretend they are invites to a meeting and later go on a private jet but he uses stunts that the plane can complete safely to scare the celebrities, pretend they are going to die and then lands them. They are surrounded by actors that know the prank. This show was made in 2015.

In 2016, Hani also started a new show named ("هانى فى الادغال", Hani in the jungle), Hany tricks some Arab celebrities into jetting off to South Africa for a wonderful safari experience. But the celebrities get scared by the jumping lions and the snakes in the box followed by a driver being eaten. This was also made in the Ramadan.

References

External links
 Hany Ramzy at Cinema.com
 
 Hany Ramzy Facebook page

1964 births
Living people
Egyptian male film actors
Egyptian male stage actors
Egyptian male television actors
Egyptian comedians
Cairo University alumni
Coptic Christians from Egypt
People from Minya Governorate
People from Alexandria